Traversodontoides is an extinct genus of therocephalian therapsids.

References

Bauriids
Therocephalia genera
Prehistoric synapsids of Asia
Fossil taxa described in 1974
Taxa named by Yang Zhongjian